Cerro San Luis Obispo (Obispeño: łpɨłhɨtšnuka ) is a  mountain in San Luis Obispo, California. It is part of the chain of peaks called the Nine Sisters. It is a common spot for hiking, jogging and mountain biking, and has steep terrain. Below the west side of the visible peak, there is a large plateau with a large wooden stage on the east end.  The large white "M" present on the east face derives from Mission College Preparatory Catholic High School.

History 
Some time around 1900, an American Civil War veteran, G. W. Chandler, lived on the mountain and planted lemons and oranges. The trees still overlook the city and are watered by two springs. The Lemon Grove Trail at the base of the mountain takes its name from these groves.

Around 1958, a local business owner, Alex Madonna, purchased a ranch on a portion of the slopes of Cerro San Luis Obispo, and constructed the Madonna Inn at its base.

Activities 
There are several trails on the mountain that are used for hiking, jogging and mountain biking.  The primary trail head is at the end of Marsh Street which provides access to the Open Space and Lemon Grove Loop. A dirt road accessible from Lemon Grove Loop leads to the summit. There is a second road cut to the summit which has been abandoned and eroded to a narrow rocky path giving it the name "Rock Garden" and making it a popular descent for mountain bikers. There is also a trail that encircles the mountain about one third the way up.

Geology 

Cerro San Luis, composed of igneous rock, is the core of an ancient volcano which came up through Franciscan sedimentary rocks.

References 

Nine Sisters
Mountains of San Luis Obispo County, California
Mountains of Southern California
Volcanic plugs of California